Twinspirits is a progressive metal artist in Padua, Italy. They are known for its members who are involved in several musical projects at once, such as keyboardist Daniele Liverani. 

After completing his project, Genius Rock Opera, Daniele Liverani desired to return to a more traditional band format, and first recruited drummer Dario Ciccioni for his experience in the rock opera. The pair soon discovered guitarist Tommy Ermolli. Bassist Alberto Rigoni soon joined what would become Twinspirits. Danish singer Søren Adamsen joined the band as vocalist after vocal auditions.

After releasing The Music that Will Heal the World in June 2007, which was received with positive reception, the band released an official video clip for the song "Fire" and prepared an Italian tour in support of the album, but personal problems prevented vocalist Søren from attending the tour. He would part ways with Twinspirits later in 2008, to be replaced by Swedish vocalist Göran Nyström.

Work began almost immediately on their album, entitled The Forbidden City, which was described as darker than its predecessor due to the change in vocalists. The album was released on September 11, 2009, and received praise for its more mature sound in comparison to The Music that Will Heal the World. After touring Italy in support of the new album, Liverani, Ciccioni, and Ermolli formed a side project named Prime Suspect, which they intended to have a "more band-oriented sounding album than a project, rooted in melodic rock and AOR."

The third Twinspirits album, entitled Legacy, was released on February 18, 2011. It contains the longest Twinspirits song to date, the 29-minute, five-movement "The Endless Sleep." Legacy was well received by press, with Kenn Jensen of powerofmetal.dk stating that "Legacy is without a doubt the best album Daniele Liverani has ever written."

Discography

Studio albums

Band members

Current members
Daniele Liverani – keyboards
Tommy Ermolli – guitar
Alberto Rigoni – bass
Göran Nyström – vocals
Dario Ciccioni – drums

Former members
 Søren Adamsen – vocals

Sources

External links
Official website

Fire official video
Making of The Music that Will Heal the World
Making of The Forbidden City

Italian progressive metal musical groups
Musical groups established in 2002
2002 establishments in Italy